Sindia may refer to:

Places
Sindia (Lycia), ancient town of Lycia
Sindia, Sardinia, Italy
Sindia, Senegal, in Thiès Region

Other uses
 Scindia, a Maratha clan
 The Sindia, a 1901 shipwreck on the beach at Ocean City, New Jersey